Branksome Hall is an independent day and boarding school for girls in Toronto, Ontario, Canada. It is an International Baccalaureate (IB) World School and a university-preparatory school. All three IB programs are offered: the Primary Years Program (PYP), Middle Years Program (MYP), and International Baccalaureate Diploma Program (DP). It goes from Junior Kindergarten to Grade 12.

Alumnae
 Sarah Levy, actress, best known as Twyla Sands on the popular Netflix TV show Schitt's Creek  
 Jackie Burroughs, Canadian actress who portrayed Aunt Hetty on CBC's Road to Avonlea
 Stacey Farber, actress, best known for her role as Ellie Nash on the Canadian teen drama Degrassi: The Next Generation

See also

References

External links
Official website

Girls' schools in Canada
Boarding schools in Ontario
Educational institutions established in 1903
Elementary schools in Toronto
High schools in Toronto
Private schools in Toronto
Preparatory schools in Ontario
International Baccalaureate schools in Ontario
1903 establishments in Ontario